Henry Master Feilden (21 February 1818 – 5 September 1875) was an English Conservative Party politician.

Career 
On 16 March 1869, the result of the 1868 general election in the borough of Blackburn was declared null and void, after an election petition had been lodged.
The two Conservatives who had been elected, William Henry Hornby and Feilden's father Joseph Feilden, were unseated when Mr Justice Willes found that there had been widespread intimidation of voters. Henry Feilden was elected at the resulting by-election on 31 March 1869, along with William Henry Hornby's son Edward.
Both candidates had appealed for support as a tribute to their fathers.

Feilden was re-elected at the 1874 general election,
and held the seat until his death in 1875
aged 57.

References

External links 
 

1818 births
1875 deaths
Conservative Party (UK) MPs for English constituencies
UK MPs 1868–1874
UK MPs 1874–1880
Politics of Blackburn with Darwen